Pseudoalteromonas translucida is a marine bacterium isolated from the Gulf of Peter the Great in the Sea of Japan.

References

External links
Type strain of Pseudoalteromonas translucida at BacDive -  the Bacterial Diversity Metadatabase

Alteromonadales
Bacteria described in 2002